Phillp L. Harnage is an American television writer and screenwriter. He is known for his work at DIC Entertainment. He resides in Santa Monica, California with his family.

Filmography

Television
 series head writer denoted in bold

 Fat Albert and the Cosby Kids (1984)
 He-Man and the Masters of the Universe (1984)
 Challenge of the GoBots (1985)
 She-Ra: Princess of Power (1986)
 Maxie’s World (1987)
 Lady Lovely Locks (1987)
 Hello Kitty's Furry Tale Theater (1987)
 Sylvanian Families (1987)
 ALF Tales (1988)
 The Legend of Zelda (1989)
 The Super Mario Bros. Super Show! (1989)
 Ring Raiders (1989)
 Camp Candy (1989-1990)
 New Kids on the Block (1990)
 The Adventures of Super Mario Bros. 3 (1990)
 Captain Planet and the Planeteers (1990-1992)
 Bill & Ted's Excellent Adventures (1991)
 Super Mario World (1991)
 Captain Zed and the Zee Zone (1991)
 G.I. Joe: A Real American Hero (1991-1992)
 Super Dave: Daredevil for Hire (1992)
 Double Dragon (1993)
 Adventures of Sonic the Hedgehog (1993)
 Hurricanes (1993)
 Street Sharks (1994-1996): season 1 head writer
 Sailor Moon (1995)
 Action Man (1995-1996)
 Dog Tracer (1996)
 The Wacky World of Tex Avery (1997)
 Extreme Dinosaurs (1997)
 Sonic Underground (1999)
 Sherlock Holmes in the 22nd Century (1999-2001)
 Archie’s Weird Mysteries (2000)
 Mary-Kate and Ashley in Action! (2001-2002)
 Liberty’s Kids (2002)
 Speed Racer X (2002)
 Sabrina’s Secret Life (2003)
 Alien Racers (2005)
 Krypto the Superdog (2005)
 Trollz (2005)
 Horseland (2006-2008)
 The Land Before Time (2007)
 Special Agent Oso (2009-2010)
 Popples (2015)
 Rainbow Ruby (2016)
 Care Bears: Unlock the Magic (2019)

Film

 Banzai Runner (1987)
 Little Golden Book Land (1989)
 Strawberry Shortcake: Dress Up Days (2005)
 Strawberry Shortcake: Seaberry Beach Party (2005)
 Inspector Gadget's Biggest Caper Ever (2005)

References

External links
 
  Biography

American male screenwriters
Living people
Year of birth missing (living people)
American male television writers
American television writers